The name Dorian was used for two tropical cyclones in the Atlantic Ocean. The name replaced Dean which was retired after the 2007 season.

Tropical Storm Dorian (2013), strong tropical storm that degenerated into an open wave in the middle of the ocean; it organized into a tropical depression once again near the Bahamas, but dissipated shortly after. 
Hurricane Dorian (2019), a record-breaking Category 5 hurricane that made a devastating landfall on the Bahamas, and stalled on Grand Bahama for two days, before it turned north and significantly impacted the Southeast U.S. and Atlantic Canada. Regarded as the worst natural disaster to strike the Bahamas.

The name was retired after 2019, and will be replaced by Dexter in the 2025 season.

See also

 Hurricane Doreen, a similar name which was used in the Eastern Pacific.
 List of storms named Durian, a similar name which was used in the Western Pacific.

Atlantic hurricane set index articles